

Elizabeth Clifford (born October 15, 1953) is a Canadian retired alpine skier.

At the 1968 Winter Olympics, she was the youngest Canadian skier ever to compete. She finished 7th at the 1970 Alpine Skiing World Cup and 10th at the 1971 Alpine Skiing World Cup. In 1971, she won the Alpine skiing World Cup in slalom skiing.

In 1970, she was inducted into Canada's Sports Hall of Fame. In 1971, she was inducted into the Canadian Olympic Hall of Fame.

World Cup victories

Overall

Individual races

References

External links
 
 
 
 
 
 
 

1953 births
Living people
Alpine skiers at the 1968 Winter Olympics
Alpine skiers at the 1976 Winter Olympics
Olympic alpine skiers of Canada
Canadian female alpine skiers
Canadian people of English descent
Skiers from Ottawa
FIS Alpine Ski World Cup champions